The 1979 Chicago mayoral election was first the primary on February 27, 1979, which was followed by the general on April 3, 1979. The election saw the election of Chicago, Illinois' first female mayor, and the first female mayor of any major American city, Jane M. Byrne. Byrne defeated Republican Wallace Johnson by a landslide 66 percent margin of victory, winning more than 82 percent of the vote. Byrne's 82% of the vote is the most any candidate has received in a Chicago mayoral election.

Byrne had won the Democratic Party's nomination by narrowly defeating incumbent mayor Michael A. Bilandic in the party's primary election.

Primaries and nominations

Democratic primary
In what was regarded to be a major upset to the Chicago Democratic political machine, Jane Byrne succeeded in pulling off an insurgent challenge to incumbent mayor Michael Bilandic. Byrne, whom Bilandic had previously fired from the post of the city's Commissioner of Consumer Sales in 1977, had launched an underdog challenge to Bilandic, who had received the backing of the Cook County Democratic Party.

Turnout in the primary was among the greatest in Chicago mayoral history. By some reports, turnout was 839,443, which was  58.97% of Chicago's 1,423,476 voters.  Turnout exceeded the average mayoral primary election turnout in the years since 1955 by more than 10 percentage points. Byrne was a first-time candidate for elected office. She campaigned as a progressive reformer. Her campaign manager was Don Rose, who had previously served as the Chicago press secretary for Martin Luther King Jr. She attacked alderman such as Edward M. Burke and Ed Vrdolyak as an "evil cabal" who ran the city's government. Her candidacy was seen as a longshot.

Byrne was endorsed by Jesse Jackson. Byrne had lambasted Bilandic's government's slow response to the 1979 Chicago blizzard, criticism which was greatly credited with fueling her upset victory. Polls, up to the election day, had shown Bilandic in the lead.

Results

|- bgcolor="#E9E9E9" align="center"
! colspan="5" rowspan="1" align="center" |Chicago Democratic Party Mayoral Primary, 1979
|- bgcolor="#E9E9E9" align="center"
! colspan="2" rowspan="1" align="left" | Candidate
! width="75" | Votes
! width="30" | %
|-
| bgcolor="#3333FF" |
| align="left" | Jane Byrne
|   
| %
|-
| bgcolor="#3333FF" |
| align="left" | Michael A. Bilandic (incumbent)
|   
| %
|-
| colspan="2" align="left" | Majority
|   
| % 
|-
| colspan="2" align="left" | Total
|  || % 
|-
|}
Byrne won a majority of the vote in 29 of the city's 50 wards, with Bilandic winning a majority in the remaining 21 wards. She swept the city's African-American wards, winning more than 2/3 of votes from them.

Republican primary
Wallace D. Johnson, an investment banker who was the chairman of the firm Howe, Barnes & Johnson Inc., won a landslide victory in the Republican primary over his sole opponent. The total number of votes cast in the Republican primary was 21,144, equal to roughly 2.6% the 809,043 votes cast in the Democratic primary. Johnson had, from 1970 through 1976, been a member of the Chicago Transit Authority board, where he was involved in creating the Super Transfer and Culture Bus, and in 1973 helped to lay the groundwork for the creation of the Regional Transportation Authority.

Results

|- bgcolor="#E9E9E9" align="center"
! colspan="5" rowspan="1" align="center" |Chicago Republican Party Mayoral Primary, 1979
|- bgcolor="#E9E9E9" align="center"
! colspan="2" rowspan="1" align="left" | Candidate
! width="75" | Votes
! width="30" | %
! width="45" | +/-
|-
| bgcolor="#FF3333" |
| align="left" | Wallace D. Johnson
|   
| %
| N/A
|-
| bgcolor="#FF3333" |
| align="left" | Raymond G. Wardingley
|   
| %
| N/A
|-
| colspan="2" align="left" | Majority
|   
| % 
| N/A
|-
| colspan="2" align="left" | Total
|  || % 
| N/A
|-
|}

Socialist Workers nomination
The Socialist Workers Party nominated Andrew Pulley. Pulley was a steelworker that had been the party's vice presidential nominee in 1972.

General election
Democrat Byrne had the support of such trade unions as the Chicago Federation of Labor and United Auto Workers. Republican nominee Johnson failed to attract much support. Socialist Workers Party nominee Pulley sought to convince voters that neither Democrats nor Republicans offered an adequate alternative for workers. He argued that, despite having support of trade unions, Byrne was "an anti-labor, anti-strike candidate". During his campaign, he urged trade union members to organize to form a labor party in Chicago, urging them to run independent labor candidates in the following year's congressional elections. Pulley, himself a member of United Steelworkers 1066 at U.S. Steel's Gary Works, argued, 
"If we don't act to establish a political party, the unions will be destroyed."

Results
With 82.05% of the vote, Byrne won the largest vote share in the history of Chicago mayoral elections (excluding the, invalid, April 1876 election). Wallace D. Johnson only carried 2 of the city's 3,100 precincts.

Byrne won a majority of the vote in each of the city's 50 wards. In fact, Byrne won all but two of the city's 3,100 precincts.

References

1979
Chicago
1979 Illinois elections
1970s in Chicago
1979 in Illinois